Throughout the United States, many rural communities are faced with severe 
healthcare workforce shortage issues. These regions often consist of a larger percentage of medically underserved individuals, in conjunction with fewer physicians, nurses, and other healthcare workers. The shortage of healthcare workers negatively impacts the quality of medical care due to decreased access to health services as well as an increase in workload placed on providers. Healthcare systems in rural communities generally have fewer personnel and infrastructure, creating substantial healthcare disparities among the United States population. Rural communities tend to have a higher incidence of chronic diseases, infant and maternal morbidity, and occupational injuries. These communities also consist of individuals who tend to be older and have a lower socioeconomic status, which directly relates to the high rate of uninsured individuals. Ethnic minorities are also increasing in number throughout rural areas, further adding to the size of healthcare disparities.

Barriers to health care
The healthcare workforce has a significant impact on the utilization of healthcare within a rural community.  Access barriers to health care, predominantly in the form of geography, can necessitate significant travel time as well as increased costs to obtain basic, primary care. Shortages in the healthcare workforce lead to overcompensation for providers due to a larger patient load, with more chronic disease management, along with overtime fees. Primary care physicians tend to be closer to retirement on average, demonstrating that these shortages are expected to worsen and pressure will only increase among the existing workforce. Due to the lack of specialists in rural areas, primary care physicians are expected to perform a greater number of procedures on a larger mix of patients. This shortage also decreases teaching and training opportunities for new providers which makes rural areas less attractive to new physicians and other medical professions from entering the workforce. These factors also make it difficult to retain medical providers and maintain existing infrastructure in terms of hospitals and clinics.
The labor shortage in terms of health care is expected to increase due to the overall aging of the population. The excess volume of patients add to providers’ workloads that are already face with limited resources. This detrimental combination effectively hinders the delivery of timely and appropriate health services. The healthcare workforce in the rural population, with smaller populations dispersed across a larger area, makes the existing and expected shortages more likely to have far-reaching, medically devastating impacts.

Patient Protection and Affordable Care Act
President Barack Obama signed the Patient Protection and Affordable Care Act (ACA) on March 23, 2010. The enactment of the ACA introduced healthcare reform throughout the United States. Some of the key objectives of the ACA are to improve quality and lower healthcare costs, create new consumer protections, and improve access to healthcare. 
In order to achieve these objectives, widespread reforms have been instituted. Included among the ACA’s many areas of focus is the rural healthcare workforce. Many of the provisions are intended to strengthen the healthcare workforce in rural areas, specifically addressing the limited access to healthcare providers. The approaches used to address this issue include: the development of national strategies to address workforce shortages and support state and community programming; training and development of healthcare providers in rural areas; and financial incentives including grant and bonus payments.

Overview of ACA provisions
Specific examples of ACA provisions addressing the development of national strategies to deal with workforce issues; training and development of healthcare providers in rural areas; and financial incentives including grant and bonus payments are listed below:

Workforce issues: create positions and maximize current supply 
Section 5503: redistributes unused residency positions. Hospitals located in areas with a higher ratio of people living in a Health Professional Service Area to the total population will be given greater priority for an increase in residency positions. 75% of positions must be in primary care or general surgery.
Section 3502: establishes grant programs to support care coordination through medical homes.
Section 5509: establishes programs to support the clinical training of current non-physicians.

Training and development
Section 1501 (1): authorizes grants to medical schools to recruit and provide focused training and experiences to students likely to practice medicine in HPSAs.  The grant aims to recruit students most likely to practice in rural areas.
Section 5403: amends the Area Health Education Center (AHEC) program. AHEC addresses workforce shortages by supporting physician recruitment and retention from medically underserved populations and those from rural and medically underserved areas.
Sections 5301, 5508 (b): reauthorize PHSA Section 747. They increase support for primary care training programs, provide traineeships to students, residents, and faculty; support the development of innovative academic units in primary care. They authorize grants to support the development of expansion of teaching health centers.

Financial incentives
Sections 5207, 5508(b), 1051 (n), 10503: expand the existing program, which provides scholarships and loan repayment to primary, dental, mental, and behavioral health care providers who practice in Health Professional Service Areas for a minimum of 2 years.
Sections 5202, 5208, 5309, 5308, 5310, 5404, 10510 (e): allow for student loan, grant, and scholarships for undergraduate and graduate nursing education and retention, loan repayment for nurse faculty, a new nurse-managed health clinic program, and grants to help minority individuals complete associate or advanced degrees in nursing.
Section 5204: creates a new program that provides up to $35,000 in loan repayment for public health professionals in pursuit of a public health degree if the individual serves full-time for a minimum of three years at a federal, local, or tribal public health agency. Health Professional Shortage Areas fall in this group.
Sections 5501, 5203: allow for Medicare 10% bonus for physicians who meet specific requirements and provide certain primary care and general surgery services.

Financing the ACA provisions 
In order to ensure the provisions described above are successfully implemented, the ACA has authorized various levels of funding in the ongoing future. Implementing each provision will rely on Congress to effectively allocate the funds authorized by the ACA. Some of the key provisions and their financing structures are outlined below:

Section 3502 - Community Health Team Grants for Medical Homes
Authorizes such sums as may be necessary (no specific years).

Section 1501(l) - Rural Physician Training Grants
Authorizes the appropriation of $4 million annually from FY 2010 through 2013.

Section 5403 - Expanding Area Health Education Centers (AHECs)
Appropriates $125 million from FY 2010 to 2014, and no less than $250,000 per AHEC annually (limited to 12 years for a program and 6 years for a center).

Section 5301 - Title VII Primary Care Training & Enhancement Programs
Authorizes $750,000 annually from FY 2010 through 2014 for capacity building grants to establish academic units in primary care and enhance interdisciplinary training.
Authorizes $125 million for FY 2010, and necessary sums from FY 2011 to 2014 to provide 5-year grants to hospitals, med schools, etc. for primary care education and training. 15% of the appropriated amount must go towards PA training programs.
Appropriates $25 million for FY 2010 and $50 million annually for FY 2011 and 2012 to provide grants for academic health centers to expand Title VII primary care residency programs.
Appropriates $230 million from FY 2011 to 2015 to cover the direct/indirect expenses incurred by academic health centers for training residents in primary care.

Section 5316 - Family Nurse Practitioner Training Demonstration
Authorizes the appropriation of necessary sums annually from FY 2011 through 2015. Funding for each grant should not exceed $60,000.

Sections 5207, 5508 (b), 1051 (n), 10503 - National Services Health Corps
Authorizes $320 million in FY 2010, $414 million for FY 2011, $535 million for FY 2012, $691 million for FY 2013, $893 million for FY 2014, and $1,155 billion for FY 2015.

Sections 5202, 5305, 5308-12 - Title VIII Nurse Workforce Development Programs
Authorizes $338 million in FY 2010 from the original $243.872 million provided, and necessary sums from FY 2011 to 2016.

Section 5204 - Public Health Care Workforce Loan Repayment Program
Authorizes $195 million for FY 2010, and necessary sums from FY 2011 to 2015.

Challenges
There are several key challenges to providing better health care in rural America. The ACA attempts to resolve these challenges by insuring more rural Americans, increasing access to care, and resolving the workforce shortage in rural areas. The effects of the ACA in regard to rectifying these challenges have yet to be determined.

Population factors 
Providers in rural areas face many disadvantages, including the fact that the United States population living in rural areas tend to be older, poorer, and uninsured in comparison to their urban counterparts. Rural Americans are also more likely to suffer from chronic illnesses.  At the same time, rural America is experiencing an out-migration of its younger population and the rural healthcare workforce is aging.

Lack of resources 
Rural hospitals tend to have fewer resources than urban hospitals and usually have a fewer number of beds. These hospitals often are understaffed or face problems due to poorly trained staff. Rural hospitals are also forced to offer a broad variety of services since these community hospitals are often the only healthcare providers in their area. Providing a mix of services puts a strain on the hospital because it is not able to focus on providing one service well, but instead must concentrate on providing as many services as possible.

Dependence on public funding 
Patients at rural hospitals tend to be older and are often low-income individuals. This means that rural hospitals depend heavily on government assistance from Medicare and Medicaid, with nearly 60% of rural hospital gross revenues coming from these programs. This makes rural hospitals incredibly vulnerable to policy changes. Often Medicare and Medicaid funding is not sufficient to cover all rural hospital patients, which is a problem that is compounded by a high rate of uninsured individuals in the community. When rural employees do not provide health insurance, rural hospitals must absorb the costs.

Insufficient access to capital 
A lack of capital means that rural hospitals often do not have the means to meet patient’s needs. Rural hospitals lag behind their urban counterparts when it comes to ability to acquire new technologies, replace aged equipment, and improve operational effectiveness. Insufficient access to capital leads to rural hospitals falling behind urban hospitals in terms of quality performance and patient outcomes.

References

Affordable Care Act